Eleanor Bergstein (born 1938) is an American writer, known for writing and co-producing Dirty Dancing, a popular 1980s film based in large part on her own childhood.

Life and career
Bergstein was born in 1938 in the Brooklyn borough of New York City. She has one older sister, Frances, in her Jewish family. Their father, Joseph, was a doctor who left much of the care of the girls to their mother, Sarah. The family spent summers in the luxury resorts Grossinger's Catskill Resort Hotel in the Catskill Mountains; and, while her parents were playing golf, Bergstein was dancing.

Bergstein was a teenage Mambo queen, competing in local competitions. While at college, she worked as a dance instructor at Arthur Murray dance studios. Bergstein graduated from the University of Pennsylvania in 1958.

In 1966, she was married to Michael Paul Goldman and worked as a novelist, including Advancing Paul Newman. This novel contains many of the themes of her famous movie. She also tried her hand at scriptwriting and had success with It's My Turn, a film starring Michael Douglas and Jill Clayburgh. During production, the producers cut an erotic dance scene from the script. That sparked Bergstein into writing a more extensive story, focusing on "dirty dancing".

The movie Dirty Dancing was released in theaters in 1987. 

In 2004, Bergstein also adapted the movie into a stage version of Dirty Dancing, which became a musical. The show opened in 2004 in Australia.

Works
Dirty Dancing: The Musical, 2004 stage production
Let It Be Me, 1995 film
Ex-Lover: A Novel, 1989 novel
Dirty Dancing, 1987 film
It's My Turn, 1980 screenplay
Advancing Paul Newman, 1973 novel

References

External links 
“A Conversation with Eleanor Bergstein, Writer and Producer of ‘Dirty Dancing,’ on its 30th Anniversary”, Sophie Aroesty, Jewcy, August 28, 2017.
"Private Dancers", June 15, 2005, The Age
Dirty Dancing, The E! True Hollywood Story, television documentary, first aired September 3, 2000
"Dirty Dancing: Baby's Out of the Corner", May 2007, USA Today

Living people
Jewish women writers
Jewish American writers
1938 births
People from the Catskills
Writers from Brooklyn
21st-century American Jews